The Mystery of Edwin Drood (or simply Drood) is a musical written by Rupert Holmes based on the unfinished Charles Dickens novel. The show was the first Broadway musical with multiple endings (determined by audience vote). The musical won five Tony Awards out of eleven nominations, including Best Musical. Holmes received Tony awards for Best Book of a Musical and Best Original Score.

The musical debuted at the New York Shakespeare Festival in August 1985. After being revised, it transferred to Broadway and ran until May 1987, followed by two national tours and a London West End production. The Roundabout Theatre Company revived the musical in 2012.

History

Inspiration
The musical Drood has two major inspirations: Charles Dickens' final and unfinished novel, The Mystery of Edwin Drood; and the British pantomime and music hall traditions that reached the height of popularity near the time of Dickens's death. 

Dickens wrote The Mystery of Edwin Drood like most of his other novels, in episodic installments. It began publication in 1870, but Dickens died suddenly that year from a stroke. He left no notes about how he intended to finish the story. Almost immediately, various authors and playwrights, including Dickens' own son, wrote their own endings. A century later, there were several "collaborations" between the late Dickens and other novelists, numerous theatrical extrapolations, and three film adaptations of the story.

At the time Dickens died, British pantomime styles, distinguished by the importance of audience participation and conventions like the principal boy, reached their height of popularity, and music hall performances with raucous, risque comedy and a distinct musical style began to be prominent. 

Rupert Holmes, the major creative contributor to the musical Drood, spent his early childhood in England.  At age three, he was taken to the theater for the first time, a modern "panto" with a cross-dressing lead boy and audience sing-alongs. By age eleven, he was fascinated by mystery books and first discovered the unfinished Dickens novel. Holmes drew on these experiences when impresario Joseph Papp, the creator and head of the New York Shakespeare Festival, approached him to write a new musical.

Concept
Holmes, a singer-songwriter who recorded the Billboard No. 1 Hit, Escape (The Piña Colada Song) and wrote songs for the Platters, the Drifters, Wayne Newton, Dolly Parton, Barry Manilow, and Barbra Streisand, first became interested in writing a musical in 1983. After a nightclub appearance where he performed "story-songs" and shared humorous anecdotes, Holmes received a note from Gail Merrifield, director of play development at the New York Shakespeare Festival and Joseph Papp’s wife. She had seen Holmes' performance and wrote suggesting he write a full-length musical.

Holmes conceived the show’s central premises drawing on his recollections of Dickens' novel and pantomime as a youth, and his later experiences with Victorian-style music hall performances. From the Dickens work, Holmes took the central plot and most of the featured characters. From pantomime, he retained the concept of the "Lead Boy,” always portrayed by a young female in male drag, that permitted him to write a love song sung by two sopranos. And pantomime inspired the most ground-breaking aspect of Drood: audience participation. From music hall traditions, he created the lead character of "The Chairman,” a sort of Master of Ceremonies instigating stage action. 

Drood is an unusual musical because Holmes wrote the book, the music, the lyrics, and the full orchestrations. Although Holmes believed no Broadway creator had done this before, and the feat was frequently mentioned in reviews and press about the show, it was more common in the early days of musical theatre. Although songwriters, including Adolf Philipp, had been credited for the books to their musicals, none had also written their own orchestrations.

In writing the book, Holmes deliberately chose not to imitate Dickens' writing style, as he felt it would be too bleak for the show he envisioned. Instead, he employed the device of a "show-within-a-show."  The cast members of Drood do not specifically play Dickens' characters. They are music hall players performing as Dickens' characters. This device allowed for the incorporation of a great deal of light comedy, not in Dickens' novel, and several musical numbers unrelated to the original story. Holmes explained his decision, stating, "This is not Nicholas Nickleby set to music – it's not a Dickensian work. It's light and fun and entertaining. But I hope – I think – that Dickens would have enjoyed it." Holmes also noted that the show “has the same relationship to Dickens that Kiss Me Kate does to The Taming of the Shrew." 

Most inventively, Holmes used a novel method to determine the play’s outcome: audience voting. At a break in the show, the audience votes on (i) who killed Drood, if he was killed; (ii) the identity of the mysterious Dick Datchery, and (iii) which two characters will become romantically involved creating a happy ending. Since every audience differs in temperament, the outcome is theoretically unpredictable, even to the actors who must quickly tally the votes and perform the chosen ending (although some smaller companies will "fix" the results to limit the number of possible endings). This device required Holmes to write numerous short endings to cover every possible voting outcome.

Deviations from the novel
There are several differences between the musical and its source material. The tone of Dickens' original book was somewhat bleak (as was Dickens' style), whereas the show is considerably more lighthearted and played for comedy.  The most notable difference in characterization involves Jasper: though Dickens' character is undoubtedly repressed and troubled, he is not depicted with the full-fledged split personality that he appears to have in the musical. Several minor characters are omitted, and the roles of others are expanded. In the musical, Bazzard is Crisparkle's assistant, whereas in the novel he is employed by Rosa's guardian, Mr. Grewgious.  Meanwhile, in order to increase the interactivity of the play and introduce doubt as to who the murderer is, the musical omits several of the novel's clues that Jasper is the killer and fabricates new clues pointing at other suspects, with an explanation given in-text that if Jasper is obviously the killer then the story would not be a mystery.

Synopsis

Act I
Act One opens as the members of the Music Hall Royale circulate among the audience, introducing themselves to the patrons. More and more members of the company add to the growing noise, until the music begins and the Chairman of the proceedings bursts forth with the show's opening number, "There You Are". They then introduce John Jasper, the 'Jekyll and Hyde' choirmaster who greets his young nephew Edwin Drood in the song "Two Kinsmen", where they express their strong friendship. Drood is engaged to the fair Miss Rosa Bud, who is Jasper's music pupil and the object of his mad obsession. Rosa's suspicion of his obsession is confirmed when at her next lesson, he asks her to sing a song he has written – "Moonfall" – an innuendo-heavy love song from Jasper to her. The kindly Reverend Crisparkle and two exotic emigrants from Ceylon, Helena and Neville Landless, arrive. Neville is immediately attracted to Rosa, which makes him a rival to both Edwin and the secretive Jasper.

Next the chairman brings the audience to London and the sinister opium den of the Princess Puffer who talks with the audience, and explains her life in "Wages of Sin". A sinewy ballet dance follows. We discover that one of Puffer's regular clients is none other than Jasper himself, who cries out the name 'Rosa Bud' during a hallucination. Puffer shows great interest in this fact, and stores it away in her memory. Back in Cloisterham, Neville and Drood meet and come to odds with each other almost immediately.

Next, The Chairman is called in to play another character as that actor is unable to come, but it turned out that the scenes of his character and the scenes of Mayor Sapsea coincide – and the characters have to disagree with each other. This results in major confusion for poor Mayor Sapsea/The Chairman, and laughs for the audience. He and Jasper sing of their conflicting minds – Jasper, of course, meaning it literally – in the patter song "Both Sides Of The Coin". We are then introduced to the drunken stonemason Durdles, and his assistant Deputy. In the graveyard, they tell us that Edwin and Rosa, who have been promised to each other since they were children and so cannot tell if they truly love each other, have called off their engagement ("Perfect Strangers"). As a parting gift, Rosa gives Drood her hair clasp, which once belonged to her mother.

It is Christmas Eve and Jasper has arranged a ‘reconciliation’ dinner for the Landless twins, Crisparkle, Rosa and Drood. In the resulting song "No Good Can Come from Bad", Neville and Drood's antagonism is reinstated, Helena's and Crisparkle's worry about Neville's reputation is shown, and it is revealed that Crisparkle used to be in love with Rosa's mother, who died after Rosa's birth. Soon the party disbands and the guests depart into a violent storm. There is a short halt here, where the actor playing Bazzard soliloquizes about how he never seems to be able to get a major part in a show, in the song "Never The Luck".

The next day Drood has vanished. Crisparkle's assistant discovers Edwin's torn coat by the river. Drood was last seen walking there with Neville the night before. Nevile is almost lynched by the townsfolk before being rescued by Crisparkle. Jasper publicly swears to track down his nephew's killer; later he visits Rosa and confesses his love for her. She is horrified and angry, and they sing "The Name Of Love And Moonfall", ending with Jasper's pursuing Rosa off-stage as the act concludes.

Act II
Act Two begins six months later, and still there is no sign of Drood. There is much speculation as to his fate. Meanwhile, it is revealed that Puffer has been investigating Drood's disappearance, but has also noticed a rather seedy looking figure who seems to be doing the same. It turns out that this man (played by the same actor who plays Drood, normally), Dick Datchery, is a private investigator. They sing "Settling Up The Score". The cast appears and summarizes the situation, warning the audience, "don't fall back on your assumptions, hasty presumptions might do you in!", telling them to think carefully of whom they will vote for as the murderer, in the song "Don't Quit While You're Ahead". As the song climbs to a climax, the actors trail off, and the Chairman announces to the audience that it was at this place that Charles Dickens laid down his pen forever.  However, they, with the audience's help, will resolve the story and the public voting begins as to who Datchery and The Murderer are; unfortunately, the actress playing Drood and, up to that point, Datchery is not chosen as Datchery and exits the theater in a huff.  Once the votes have been tabulated, the cast come out and sing "Don't Quit While You're Ahead" to welcome the audience back into the story and to remind them that the mystery has not been solved.

Puffer finds Rosa, reveals that years before she had been Rosa's nanny and tells her backstory in the song "Garden Path To Hell"; she tells of a man she loved who made her become a prostitute to please his friends and then left her. Once she lost her looks, she found a way to earn money – selling opium. She then continues with "Puffer's Revelation" and reveals the identity of Datchery (previously chosen by the audience.) The evening's Datchery (either Bazzard, Reverend Crisparkle, Helena, Neville, or Rosa) explains in their version of the revelation song "Out On A Limerick" why they donned the costume and tracked down the killer; the girls did it mainly to disguise their gender, Neville to prove his innocence, Crisparkle to help both Neville and Helena, and Bazzard to give himself both a dramatic reveal and an important character to play. The gist of each song is that the character followed Jasper to his house and found the clasp that Rosa gave Drood, which Jasper would have had only if he had taken it from Drood. Jasper's double nature reveals itself, and he admits that he strangled his nephew while under the influence of the laudanum that he reveals he poured into the wine the night of the dinner party ("Jasper's Confession").

Durdles the gravedigger, however, disagrees; he witnessed the crime and knows who truly killed Edwin Drood. Depending on the audience's vote, the finger is pointed at Bazzard, Crisparkle, Helena, Neville, Puffer, Rosa or Durdles. The murderer confesses, then sings a reprise of one of several numbers, beginning with "A Man Could Go Quite Mad", to admit his or her culpability; the gist of each of these songs is that the character who killed Drood was seeking to kill Jasper, not Drood, for his or her own purpose – Puffer to protect Rosa, Rosa to save herself, Helena to get revenge on Jasper for ruining her twin's chance at a new beginning, Bazzard to bring himself into the limelight, Neville because he wanted Rosa for himself, and Crisparkle because he killed Rosa's mother out of jealousy and religious mania and wanted to protect both Rosa and Neville from Jasper's evil. However, because of the storm, Jasper had walked with Drood for a while and then given him his coat to wear for the journey home, so the murderer, because of the laudanum in the wine and the foul night weather, mistook Drood for Jasper. (Durdles lacks this motivation, however, so his confession is simply that, in his drunkenness, he mistook Drood for a ghost.) If, although not likely, the audience chooses Jasper as the murderer, Durdles does not interrupt and a second confession is not performed (Some theaters will not count Jasper votes, to make sure that there is a twist).

Still, a happy ending is needed, and the Chairman asks the audience to choose two lovers from among the remaining cast members. The two chosen members declare their love, and then reprise "Perfect Strangers". Just then, there comes a noise from the crypt, and a very-much-alive Edwin Drood appears, ready to tell all what really happened on the night of his disappearance ("The Writing On The Wall"). What happened was that when Drood was attacked, he was only stunned when he fell and not killed. Jasper dragged him to a crypt where he left him. When Drood woke, he escaped and fled from Cloisterham, only returning so that he could find out who wanted him dead. He sings to the audience, eventually joined by the rest of the cast, imploring them to hold on to life for as long as they possibly can and telling them that 'holding on to life is all.' The mystery is solved, and the show concludes as the cast sings to the audience to read the writing on the wall.

Murderers
John Jasper – Jasper was madly in love with Rosa Bud, and his violent split personality gladly killed Drood. His confession is a reprise of "A Man Could Go Quite Mad" and "Moonfall". Jasper's confession is performed no matter who is chosen as the murderer, and the audience is discouraged from voting for him since he is the obvious solution.   
Rosa Bud – Meant to kill Jasper in revenge for his lustful advances and also due to her own mental instability caused by Jasper's persecution, but killed Drood by accident as Drood was wearing Jasper's coat. Her confession is a reprise of "A Man Could Go Quite Mad" and "No Good Can Come From Bad" 
Neville Landless – Humiliated by Drood, Neville murdered him in order to regain his pride and also to have a chance with Rosa Bud. His confession is a reprise of "A Man Could Go Quite Mad" and "No Good Can Come From Bad" in the original Broadway production, later changed to "A British Subject" 
Helena Landless – Knowing her brother's hot temper, Helena murdered Drood so Neville would not be tempted to seek revenge. Her confession is a reprise of "A Man Could Go Quite Mad" and "No Good Can Come From Bad" in the original Broadway production, later changed to "A British Subject"  
Princess Puffer – Intended to kill Jasper in order to protect Rosa from his advances, but accidentally killed Drood because he was wearing Jasper's coat and because she was confused after having smoked opium for Dutch courage. Her confession is a reprise of "The Wages of Sin" 
The Rev. Mr. Crisparkle – Crisparkle was madly in love with Rosa's mother, and he saw Rosa as a reincarnation of her. He murdered Drood so that he could marry Rosa, thinking her to be the woman he loved. This version of Crisparkle's confession was introduced in the first national tour, and has been used in all productions since. His confession is a reprise of "A Man Could Go Quite Mad" and "No Good Can Come From Bad" in the original Broadway production, later changed to "A British Subject". 
Bazzard – In an effort to boost his role in the show, murders Drood.  This is definitely the most metatheatrical of the endings. His confession is a reprise of "A Man Could Go Quite Mad" and "Never the Luck" 
Durdles – After Jasper laid Drood in the crypt, Durdles believed the still-alive Drood to be a ghost and so smashed his head in.  (Even Durdles admits the silliness of this motive within his solo, but laments that because he has been chosen he must have one.) This solo was not used in the original Broadway production and was added for the first national tour. His confession is a reprise of "Off to the Races"

Characters
As Drood is metatheatrical, the characters of the play The Mystery of Edwin Drood are played by actors of the "Music Hall Royale", within the production. The following are the dual roles each cast member plays. The actress portraying Miss Alice Nutting/Edwin Drood also performs the role of Dick Datchery up until the Voting portion of the evening. However, this is merely a "bit" within the context of The Music Hall Royale – that Miss Nutting only portrays Datchery due to a contractual obligation for her to appear in both acts of the play. Ultimately, the audience decides who Dick Datchery is within the confines of Dickens' story.

The role of Crisparkle was originally portrayed both in the readings and Delacorte production by the actor/playwright, Larry Shue. When Shue died in a plane crash between the show's run at the Delacorte and its opening on Broadway, Rupert Holmes renamed the Music Hall Royale performer who portrayed Crisparkle from Wilfred Barking-Smythe to Cedric Moncrieffe, out of respect for Shue.

Musical numbers

 Act I
 "There You Are" – Chairman with Angela, Deirdre, Alice, Victor, Clive and Company
 "A Man Could Go Quite Mad" – Jasper
 "Two Kinsmen" – Jasper and Drood
 "Moonfall" – Rosa
 "Moonfall Quartet" – Rosa, Helena, Wendy and Beatrice
 "The Wages of Sin" – Puffer
 "Jasper's Vision" – Dream Ballet*
 "Ceylon" – Neville, Helena and Company
 "A British Subject" – Neville, Helena, Drood, Rosa, Crisparkle and Company†
 "Both Sides of the Coin" – Sapsea and Jasper
 "Perfect Strangers" – Rosa and Drood
 "No Good Can Come from Bad" – Neville, Jasper, Rosa, Drood, Helena, Crisparkle and Waiter
 "Never the Luck" – Bax / Bazzard and Company
 "The Name of Love" / "Moonfall" – Jasper, Rosa and Company††

 Act II
 "An English Music Hall" – Chairman and Company†
 "Settling Up the Score" – Puffer, Datchery and Company
 "Off to the Races" – Sapsea, Durdles, Deputy and Company§
 "Don't Quit While You're Ahead" – Puffer, Datchery and Company
 "Don't Quit While You're Ahead" (Reprise) – Company*
 "Settling Up the Score" (Reprise) – Chairman, Suspects and Company*
 "The Garden Path to Hell" – Puffer
 "Puffer's Revelation" – Puffer*
 "Out on a Limerick" – Datcherys
 "Jasper's Confession" – Jasper
 "Murderer's Confession"
 "Perfect Strangers" (Reprise)*
 "The Writing on the Wall" – Drood and Company

* Not included on the original cast recording

† Reinstated for the 2012 Broadway revival

§ Moved at the end of Act I for the Tams-Witmark licensed version and the 2012 Broadway revival

†† Moved after "Settling Up the Score" for the Tams-Witmark licensed version and the 2012 Broadway revival

For the version of Drood that Tams-Witmark licenses to theater companies, Holmes made a variety of changes to the score and libretto, many of which reflect the versions seen in the 1987 London production and the 1988 North American touring production. The numbers "A Man Could Go Quite Mad," "Ceylon," "Settling Up the Score," and the quartet reprise of "Moonfall" are not standard but are provided as "additional material" that theaters can choose to perform at their options.
 A new song, "A Private Investigation", is offered to replace "Settling Up the Score".
 "Off to the Races" swaps places with "The Name of Love/Moonfall (Reprise)" and becomes the Act One finale.
 "Ceylon" is replaced by "A British Subject", while "England Reigns" became the new Act Two opening (both numbers had been in the show during the first staged reading in 1985).
 Durdles is added as a possible murderer, and a "Murderer's confession" was composed for him, to the tune of "Off to the Races". The confessions of Neville, Helena and Crisparkle were rewritten to be reprises of "A British Subject."

 Notes
 A  This song is performed by a different actor each night, depending upon audience vote.
 B  This song is performed by a different actor each night, depending upon audience vote, or alternately, not performed at all if the audience has voted for Jasper.
 C  This song is performed by a different pair of actors every night, depending upon audience vote.

Recordings

In 1985, a recording was made of The Mystery of Edwin Drood featuring the original Broadway cast.  This recording was released by Polydor with the additional subtitle, The Solve-It-Yourself Broadway Musical (Polydor 827969) and the CD included versions of "Out on a Limerick" by all five possible Datcherys (Rosa, Crisparkle, Bazzard, Neville, and Helena) and all six possible Murderer's Confessions (Puffer, Rosa, Bazzard, Crisparkle, Neville, and Helena), as well as an "instructional track" entitled "A Word From Your Chairman...."  The LP and cassette included only the opening-night Confession and murderer, and omitted the "lovers." A 1990 re-issue of the cast album by Varèse Sarabande (Varèse 5597) included two tracks, "Ceylon" and "Moonfall Quartet", that are on the original LP and cassette, but not on the CD. It included only Bazzard's version of "Out on a Limerick" and two Murderer Confessions (Rosa's and Puffer's).  The Polydor recording was briefly available on cassette and LP, and ultimately re-released by Varèse Sarabande.  Both versions of the cast album are currently out of print, but can sometimes be found (often at a high price) through secondhand vendors or online auction sites.

An Australian cast album (GEP Records 9401) was released in 1994.  This recording did not include "Ceylon" or "Moonfall Quartet", but did include three previously unrecorded tracks: "A British Subject", "Puffer's Revelation", and "Durdles' Confession". The Australian cast album was performed by a largely non-professional cast and used (arguably crude) midi sequencing in lieu of a live orchestra. Two songs that were omitted from Drood before it reached Broadway, "An English Music Hall" and "Evensong," (a duet between Rosa and Crisparkle) were later recorded for the 1994 album, Lost In Boston. Other songs that never made into the Broadway or London/'88 Tour (Tams-Witmark) versions include: "When the Wicked Man Comes" (sung by a much younger Deputy), "Sapsea's Song" (a music hall ditty for Mayor Sapsea),  "I Wouldn't Say No" (a song and dance routine for Durdles) as well as "When Shall These Three Meet Again" – a group number which can be heard as underscoring throughout the show and in the murderer's confession: "But the night was far from bright..."

On January 29, 2013, a recording featuring the 2012 cast of the Broadway revival was released by DRG Records in a 2-disc set and as a digital download.  DRG Records describes the recording as "the complete musical program on 2 compact discs" for the first time.  Differences between this recording and the original recording include confessions from all eight possible murderers, two versions of "Out on a Limerick" (Bazzard and Helena), the lovers' reprise of "Perfect Strangers" (featuring a combination of Princess Puffer & Deputy, Helena & Neville, and Rosa & Durdles), a revised "Ceylon" (which now incorporates "A British Subject"), a previously cut song ("An English Music Hall") as the new opening for Act II, and the "Opium Den Ballet". Holmes penned the liner notes for the album that will reflect new material and revisions. Holmes also re-orchestrated the production for a 19-piece orchestra led by Paul Gemignani.

Productions
After Rupert Holmes wrote an initial draft that lasted three-and-a-half hours, and performed it, solo, for Joseph Papp, Gail Merrifield, and Wilford Leach, (the New York Shakespeare Festival's artistic director), Papp offered to produce the show as part of the Festival (also known as "Shakespeare in the Park"), and told Holmes that it would be immediately transferred to Broadway if it was deemed a success. The original production of The Mystery of Edwin Drood premiered in New York City's Central Park at the Delacorte Theatre on August 21, 1985 after only three weeks of rehearsals. Notably, Holmes conceived most of the orchestrations himself, a rarity for a Broadway composer.

After the final Festival performance on September 1, preparations for the Broadway transfer (retaining the original cast) immediately got underway. Following a great deal of editing (the Delacorte version contained 32 original songs and was nearly three hours long) The Mystery of Edwin Drood opened on Broadway at the Imperial Theatre on December 2, 1985.  Roughly halfway through the run, the title of the musical was officially shortened to Drood (the name it continues to be licensed under).  The show ran for 608 performances (not including 24 previews), and closed on May 16, 1987.  The Broadway production was produced by Papp and directed by Leach, with choreography by Graciela Daniele.

The opening night cast of the Broadway production starred George Rose, Cleo Laine, John Herrera, Howard McGillin, Patti Cohenour, and Jana Schneider, who were all nominated for 1986 Tony Awards for their performances, as well as Betty Buckley in the title role. Donna Murphy, Judy Kuhn, and Rob Marshall were members of the ensemble. Marshall, who would later become best known as a theater/film director-choreographer, was the Dance Captain and Graciela Daniele's assistant choreographer. Kuhn (in her Broadway debut) served as the understudy to both Buckley and Cohenour, and then left in 1986 for her featured roles in Rags and, later, Les Mis. Before the show ended its run, Murphy, who was understudy to Cleo Laine and Jana Schneider, took over the title role. Other notable replacements during the show's run included Alison Fraser (taking over for Jana Schneider), Paige O'Hara (taking over for Donna Murphy as Drood after being her understudy), as well as Loretta Swit and later Karen Morrow, who stepped into Laine's roles.

In 1988, several months after closing on Broadway, a slightly-revised version of Drood, directed by Rob Marshall (with his sister Kathleen as his assistant), began its first North America tour at the Kennedy Center Opera House in Washington, DC, with Rose, Schneider and O'Hara reprising their leads, and Jean Stapleton playing Laine's role. During a break in the tour George Rose returned to his home in the Dominican Republic, and was murdered during his stay. Rose was succeeded by Clive Revill.

The show, also enjoyed a 1987 West End run at the Savoy Theatre in London, a second U.S. national tour, a production at the Shaw Festival in Niagara-on-the-Lake, Ontario, Canada, and numerous regional and professional and amateur theatrical productions worldwide. In 2007–08, a London revival, presented as a chamber piece and directed by Ted Craig, ran at the Warehouse Theatre.

In 2012, a London West End revival of the musical played at the Arts Theatre for a limited season from 18 May. The cast was headed by Wendi Peters as Princess Puffer, with Natalie Day as Edwin Drood, Daniel Robinson as John Jasper and Victoria Farley as Rosa Budd. The production was directed by Matthew Gould.

The Roundabout Theatre Company presented a Broadway revival at Studio 54, which opened in November 2012 and ran for 136 performances through March 10, 2013. The production was directed by Scott Ellis, and starred Chita Rivera as Puffer, Stephanie J. Block as Drood, Will Chase as Jasper, Jim Norton as the Chairman and Gregg Edelmann as Crisparkle.

Awards and nominations

Original Broadway production

2012 Broadway revival

References

Further reading

External links
 
 Licensing agency Concord/Tams-Witmark
 
 
 Tribute page for the original Broadway production

1985 musicals
Broadway musicals
Musicals based on works by Charles Dickens
Musicals based on novels
Edgar Award-winning works
Tony Award for Best Musical
Works by Rupert Holmes
Fiction with alternate endings
Tony Award-winning musicals
Musicals set in London
The Mystery of Edwin Drood